Sir John Gay Newton Alleyne, 3rd Baronet (8 September 1820 – 20 February 1912) was a British businessman and engineer.

Biography
Alleyne was born in Alleynedale Hall in Barbados, the son of Sir Reynold Abel Alleyne, 2nd Baronet, and his wife Rebecca, daughter of John Alton. He was educated at Harrow School and in Bonn University. His first work was in the sugar industry in his home in Barbados, on his family slave plantation. His father received compensation for the slaves he owned after abolition, and John inherited some of this money.

He was Warden of Dulwich College between 1845 and 1851, president of the Steel and Iron Institute. Alleyne had joined the Butterley Company in 1852 as its first manager at a time when highly professional and highly paid managers were being brought into the industry. He served as manager and chief engineer of the iron works for 28 years. It was he who designed the roof of St Pancras station which has a span of 240 feet (73 m) and forged the girders at Butterley.  He also carried out the project of a two-track railway bridge over the Maas at Dordrecht in the Netherlands. His addresses were given as Belper in Derbyshire and Falmouth.

Alleyne patented a method in 1861 which allowed hot ingots to be moved around a roller after it had passed by just one person. During the production of steel sections the bar has to be repeatedly put through rollers. Allowing this to happen using just one person provided a substantial increase in productivity. However his most notable invention was probably the two high reversing steel mill patented in 1870, which used two steam engines to allow metal ingots to be repeatedly rolled in order to get the correct size and section. With this technique the steel did not have to be moved to re-enter the rolling process but merely had to be moved back into the rolling machine once it had passed through. He also devised a method of determining the percentages of phosphorus in steel using a spectroscope.

In his spare time he was an amateur astronomer and metalworker in his workshop at home.

Alleyne married Augusta Isabella, daughter of Sir Henry FitzHerbert, 3rd Baronet, in 1851. Alleyne died 20 February 1912, aged 91.

References

1820 births
1912 deaths
Baronets in the Baronetage of Great Britain
People from Belper
People educated at Harrow School
British people of Barbadian descent